Heinrich Gollwitzer (born 30 October 1923) is a German former sports shooter. He competed in the 25 metre rapid fire pistol event at the 1960 Summer Olympics.

Olympic Games
1960 Summer Olympics in Rome, competing for the United Team of Germany:
 Shooting – Men's 25 metre rapid fire pistol – 20th place

References

External links
 

1923 births
Possibly living people
German male sport shooters
Olympic shooters of the United Team of Germany
Shooters at the 1960 Summer Olympics
Sportspeople from Nuremberg